Leonid Vladimirovich Shebarshin (24 March 1935 – 30 March 2012) became head of the First Chief Directorate of the KGB in January 1989, when the former FCD chief, Vladimir Kryuchkov, was promoted to KGB chief. Prior to that, Shebarshin had served as Kryuchkov's deputy from April 1987.

Early life
After graduating in 1952 from high school with a silver medal, Shebarshin entered the Indian branch of the Moscow Institute of Oriental Studies. When the institute closed in 1954, he was transferred to the third year of Faculty of Oriental Studies MGIMO.

In 1957, he married a classmate, a student of the Chinese Branch Nina Vassilyevna Pushkina. Upon graduation, in October, 1958, he was assigned to work as a referent at the USSR Embassy in Pakistan. In 1962, he was promoted to the post of third secretary of the embassy and got a position at the department of South-East Asian Affairs of the USSR.

Pakistan
Un 1962, Shebarshin was invited to join the KGB First Chief Directorate, where began a new career in the rank of second lieutenant and security officer. After a year of training at an intelligence school, he was sent to work in Pakistan under diplomatic cover.

At the time, the Pakistan's participation in military-political blocs CENTO and SEATO, close ties with the United States, the conflict relations with neighboring India, and rapprochement with China determined the importance of the Pakistan branch for the Soviet intelligence. The acquisition sources in U.S. facilities located in Pakistan was the most important task of all foreign residencies of the KGB as the region was a large American colony in India, hosting military advisers, diplomats, spies, journalists, etc. 

At the initiative of the Soviet Union, leaders of the warring parties, Pakistani President Ayub Khan and Indian Prime Minister Lal Bahadur Shastri met in January 1966 in Tashkent to end the Indo-Pakistani War of 1965. This was a major diplomatic success of the Soviet delegation, headed by Alexei Kosygin. Shebarshin was promoted for contributing to the preparation for the negotiations. Shebarshin's supervisors later stated that he "achieved concrete results in the recruiting work," hinting that he bribed intelligence agents and acquired information.

India
In 1968, Shebarshin returned to Moscow and took a year-long training course to improve managerial staff. In early 1971, he was sent as a deputy KGB resident in India, and in 1975, he was appointed a resident.

While Shebarshin was on trip, there was another Indo-Pakistani War, which ended with the division of Pakistan and the secession of East Pakistan as Bangladesh, along with a state of emergency in India. Activities of American representatives in India required close attention of the Soviet intelligence team; for decades, the United States remained the main opponent of the Soviet Union and the main object of the Soviet intelligence's aspirations. India's relations with China also played great importance during that period. Job residency on the key areas were assessed positively by the center and the political leadership of the USSR.

Iran
In April 1977, a six-year trip to India ended, and in late 1978, he received orders to prepare to work in Pahlavi Iran. Intelligence predicting the fall of the monarchy in Iran came true when the Shah Mohammad Reza Pahlavi, in January 1979, ran for the border. The spiritual leader of the opposition, Ayatollah Khomeini, returned to Iran and received national recognition the title of "Imam". The Iranian Revolution marked an unprecedented intensification of the internal political struggle, degenerated into armed clashes and numerous acts of terror, undertaken by all contending parties.

Losing a loyal ally and client, the Shah, he tried to regain its position in Iran, the United States, stepped up the opponents and supporters of the Soviet Union. In November 1979, students, the followers of Khomeini took "by storm the U.S. Embassy and hostage-taking of American diplomats, Iran's relationship with the U.S. are broken. These, however, does not mean changing the situation in favor of the USSR. The Iranian leadership was determined to prevent the growing influence of its northern neighbor. The Soviet invasion of Afghanistan in December 1979 has led to a noticeable cooling of the Iranian-Soviet relations and the reason for the repeated attacks on the Soviet embassy."

The residency suffered losses, the conditions for work with sources being extremely complex. Still, Moscow has received accurate and timely intelligence information. In 1982 was the worst event in the life of Shebarshin, treason. He escaped through Turkey to the West on a false British passport residency officer, Vladimir Kuzichkin (as it turned out later that the traitor was recruited by British intelligence in the Shah's time, and, panicked by the danger of exposure, ran). The consequences of betrayal was partly contained. A few sources, which could tell the traitor, were withdrawn from the blow, but the moral and political damage was great. Whatever the causes and circumstances of incidents, the resident is fully responsible for everything that happens at the station. On the flight AK was reported to Brezhnev. "Well," said Leonid Ilyich, "is a war and a war without the loss does not happen."

Later life
In 1983, Shebarshin returned to Moscow for a few months in the headquarters unit under the chief of the PGU Vladimir Kryuchkov and was appointed deputy chief of information-analytical department of intelligence. In 1984 Shebarshin, accompanying Kryuchkov, went on mission in Kabul belligerent. Until mid-1991, he had to commit more than 20 missions in the Democratic Republic of Afghanistan to become intimately familiar, with the leaders of the country Babrak Karmal, Mohammad Najibullah, and Sultan Ali Keshtmand. In 1987, Shebarshin appointed deputy chief of PGU KGB and manages intelligence operations in the Middle East and Africa. In February 1989, he replaced Kryuchkov as vice president and he was promoted to the rank of lieutenant general.

In September 1991, as a result of differences with the new leadership of the KGB submits a report on the resignation and dismissed from military service.

At the end of that year, together with his colleagues and friends – former chief of analytical department of the KGB, Lieutenant-General Leonov and former vice-president – Head of the Main Directorate of the KGB in Moscow and Moscow region, Lieutenant-General V. Prilukovym establish AO Russia national office of economic security."

LV Shebarshin awarded the Order of the Red Banner (1981), Red Star (1970), the medal "For Military Merit" (1967), a "honorary member of the State Security" (1972). His name is immortalized in the museum's Foreign Intelligence Service.

When KGB Chief Kryuchkov was arrested following the unsuccessful August 1991 coup against Mikhail Gorbachev, Shebarshin became head of the KGB for two days. RSFSR President Boris Yeltsin objected to the appointment and demanded a new candidate. He was replaced by Vadim Bakatin, whose job was essentially to dismantle the KGB. Shebarshin returned to his post as FCD head until Bakatin announced a new FCD deputy director, Vladimir Rozhkov, without consulting him. Shebarshin resigned his post on 20 September 1991.

With his friend, Nikolai Leonov, Shebarshin founded a consulting firm, the Russian National Economic Security Service (RNESS), which is based in Moscow.

He committed suicide in Moscow by shooting himself with his own gun. He was 77. By that time, he had survived a stroke which led to complete blindness. According to his friends and colleagues, he suffered from hard depression and lost a lot of weight, which was caused by a serious illness.

See also 

Vladimir Lokhov

References

External links 
Последний бой КГБ (The Last Battle of the KGB) Leonid Shebarshin memories, Moscow (2013), 256 p (in Russian) – 

1935 births
2012 suicides
Military personnel from Moscow
KGB chairmen
KGB officers
Moscow State Institute of International Relations alumni
Soviet diplomats
Suicides by firearm in Russia
Burials in Troyekurovskoye Cemetery
KGB operatives in Iran